The Madonna of the Cherubim is a painting of  by the Italian Renaissance painter Andrea Mantegna in the Pinacoteca di Brera, Milan.

References 
Web Gallery of Art page
 Pinacoteca di Brera homepage

1485 paintings
Angels in art
Paintings of the Madonna and Child by Andrea Mantegna
Paintings in the collection of the Pinacoteca di Brera